The Fujifilm G-mount is a type of interchangeable lens mount designed by Fujifilm for use in the cameras of their Fujifilm GFX series. These cameras have interchangeable lenses. The respective lenses are designed for 43.8 mm x 32.9 mm medium format sensors.

Fujifilm G-mount cameras

Fujifilm has released the following cameras that use the G-mount:

Fujifilm GFX 50S
Fujifilm GFX 50R
Fujifilm GFX100
Fujifilm GFX100S
Fujifilm GFX50S II

Fujifilm G-mount lens system 

The crop factor compared to the 35 mm format as a reference is 0.79.
Ratio of the reference frame's diagonal (35 mm format) to the diagonal of the image sensor in question (Fujifilm GFX): 

As of November 2022 there are 27 lenses available for the G-mount; 14 from Fujifilm's Fujinon brand and 13 from third party companies.

See also
Fujinon
Fujifilm X-mount
Fujifilm X series

References

External links
 Official Fujifilm GFX product page
 G-Mount Road map

Lens mounts
G-mount